Aisake is a Melanesian name. Notable people with this name include:

 Aisake Nadolo (1964–2009), Fijian rugby union player
 Aisake Tarogi (born 1981), Fijian rugby union player
 Aisake Ó hAilpín (born 1985), Fijian-Irish sportsperson
 Lusiano Aisake, king of Uvea
 ʻAisake Eke, Tongan politician